Nigel Fenton Palmer FBA (28 October 1946 – 8 May 2022) was a British Germanist and Professor Emeritus at the University of Oxford.

Career
Nigel F. Palmer went to Hyde Grammar School and then read Modern Languages at Worcester College, Oxford where he graduated in 1969 with a first class degree after spending his year abroad in Vienna. In 1970 he took up a position as lecturer in German at Durham University. His DPhil thesis (1975) was on the German and Dutch versions of the Visio Tnugdali. He was made a fellow of Oriel College, Oxford in 1976 and Professor of Medieval German Literature and Language from 1992 to 2012 at St Edmund Hall, Oxford as successor to Peter Ganz. 

He worked on a wide range of topics in mediaeval German language and literature, among them the ‘Literary topography of South West Germany in the later Middle Ages’, an attempt to establish a literary history of this region on the basis of the manuscript sources and library history (Latin and German). Other areas of special interest were blockbooks and their place in early printing history, the interface between Latin literature and German literature in the Middle Ages, and palaeography and codicology of the period 1100–1550. He was a member of the British Academy since 1997. His work as editor of Oxford German Studies was featured in the celebratory volume 50/4. In 2022, he was awarded the inaugural Meister-Eckhart-Forschungspreis.

Selected publications

 The catalogue of medieval and early modern textual witnesses of German and Latin the '15 Zeichen des Jüngsten Gerichts' (15 Signs Before Doomsday) is available via https://handschriftencensus.de/forschungsliteratur/pdf/4224 

A full list of publications to 2007 will be found in Bibelübersetzung und Heilsgeschichte.

References

External links
 University of Oxford Faculty Profile
 
 Obituary (St Edmund Hall)

1946 births
2022 deaths
Academics of the University of Oxford
Fellows of the British Academy
Fellows of St Edmund Hall, Oxford
Germanic studies scholars
People from Ashton-under-Lyne